Ali Suljić (born 18 September 1997) is a Swedish professional footballer who plays as a defender for Swedish club Helsingborg.

Club career
Born in Motala, Suljić started his career with local side Motala AIF before joining English side Chelsea in 2013.

Following his release by Chelsea, he returned to Sweden, eventually signing with Allsvenskan side Helsingborg ahead of the 2022 season.

International career
Suljić has represented Sweden at youth international level. He remains eligible to represent Bosnia and Herzegovina.

Career statistics

Club

References

External links
 

1997 births
Living people
Swedish people of Bosnia and Herzegovina descent
Swedish footballers
Sweden youth international footballers
Association football defenders
Division 2 (Swedish football) players
Superettan players
Ettan Fotboll players
Allsvenskan players
Motala AIF players
Chelsea F.C. players
BK Häcken players
IF Brommapojkarna players
Helsingborgs IF players
Swedish expatriate footballers
Swedish expatriate sportspeople in England
Expatriate footballers in England